Bobigny is a commune, or town, in the northeastern suburbs of Paris, Île-de-France, France. Bobigny is the prefecture (capital city) of the Seine-Saint-Denis department, as well as the seat of the Arrondissement of Bobigny. It is the 11th most populous commune in Seine-Saint-Denis (2019).

Inhabitants are called Balbyniens. Bobigny is the seat of the Seine-Saint-Denis prefecture. The first IKEA store in France was located in this commune.

Transport 
Bobigny is served by two stations on Paris Métro Line 5: Bobigny – Pantin – Raymond Queneau and Bobigny – Pablo Picasso. It can also be reached from the outer terminus of Paris Métro Line 7 at La Courneuve.

Economy 
Valeo has management branches (Valeo Transmissions group and Valeo Friction Materials group) here. It was also the manufacturing base used by Meccano for French Dinky Toys from 1933 until 1970, when the factory was closed and later demolished. Production of Dinky Toys was then transferred to the Meccano factory in Calais until 1972, when the last new model, a Renault 4 la poste, was produced.

Toponymy 
Its name is derived from Roman-period Balbiniacum, "the place of Balbo or Balbinus or Balbinius"; or "of the dumb or silent man/men" (Gaulish: Irish Gaelic balbh = "dumb, silent").

History 
During World War II, approximately 20,000 Jews were shipped from a railway station in Bobigny. Their ultimate destinations were the Nazi camps.

Population

List of mayors

Education 
The commune has 14 public preschools (écoles maternelles), 15 public elementary schools, four public junior high schools, three public senior high schools/sixth-form colleges, and one private school.
 Junior high schools: Collège Auguste Delaune, Collège Jean-Pierre Timbaud, Collège Pierre Sémard, and Collège République et SEGPA
Senior high/Sixth-form: Lycée professionnel Alfred Costes, Lycée Louise Michel, Lycée polyvalent André Sabatier
École, collège et lycée Charles Péguy is a private school from elementary to senior high/sixth-form

There is also a school of hotel management, École hôtelière de Bobigny.

The Bobigny campus of Paris 13 University is its second-largest. It focuses on the medical sciences, and hosts a strong medical degree.

Personalities 
Bobigny is the birthplace of:
 Charles Itandje (born 1982), football goalkeeper
 Gaël Monfils, tennis player
 Valentin Courrent, rugby player
 Odsonne Edouard, football player

Bobigny is the place of death of:

• Jacques Brel, Belgian singer-songwriter.

Heraldry

International relations 

Bobigny is twinned with:
 Serpukhov, Moscow Oblast (Russia)
 Potsdam, Brandenburg (Germany)

See also 
Communes of the Seine-Saint-Denis department
Bobigny cemetery

References

External links 

 Official website (in French)

Communes of Seine-Saint-Denis
Prefectures in France